The 2010–11 FA Women's Cup was the 40th season of the association football knockout competition. It is the women's national cup competition for England. The competition was won by Arsenal, who won their eleventh FA Women's Cup. They beat Bristol Academy 2–0 in the final at the Ricoh Arena in Coventry.

Teams

First Round Proper 
Source: BBC Sport

Second Round Proper 
Source: BBC Sport

Third Round Proper 
Source: BBC Sport

Fourth Round Proper 
Source: BBC Sport

Fifth Round Proper 
Source: BBC Sport

Sixth Round Proper 
Source: BBC Sport

Semi-finals

Final

References

External links 
 The FA Women's Cup at thefa.com
 Shekicks.net Results

2011
Cup